is a city on the southeastern flank of Mount Fuji in Shizuoka Prefecture, Japan. ,  the city had an estimated population of 88,370 in 36,096 households, and a population density of 450 persons per km².

Geography
Mount Fuji is located to the west, and Mount Hakone to the east, with the Tanzawa Mountains to the north and Mount Ashitaka to the south. The area is noted for its numerous golf courses, with the Mitsui Sumitomo Visa Taiheiyo Masters taking place annually.

Surrounding municipalities
Shizuoka Prefecture
Oyama
Susono
Fujinomiya
Fuji
Kanagawa Prefecture
Hakone

Demographics
Per Japanese census data, the population of Gotemba has grown over the past 50 years.

Climate
The city has a climate characterized by characterized by hot and humid summers, and relatively mild winters (Köppen climate classification Cfa).

History 

Gotemba was the location of the earliest known settlement founded in the region of Shizuoka which dates back 2,000 years ago. The inhabitants of the area (including Gotemba) were not ethnically Japanese and were likely Ainu.

Gotemba was the site of a shōen belonging to Ise Shrine in the Heian period. During the Edo period the area was part of Odawara Domain. After the start of the Meiji period, it became part of Shizuoka Domain until the abolition of the han system in 1871 and the establishment of Shizuoka Prefecture. The opening of Gotemba Station on what was then the Tōkaidō Main Line on February 1, 1889, spurred development of the area. With the establishment of the modern municipalities system on April 1, 1889, Gotemba Town was created within Suntō District, along with Fujioka Village, Harasato Village, Ino Village, Tamaho Village, and Takane Village.

However, the opening of the Tanna Tunnel on December 1, 1934, resulted in the route of Tōkaidō Main Line shifting south to Atami, leaving Gotemba on the spur Gotemba Line, which resulted in temporary depopulation. During the pre-war era, Gotemba was a major base area for the Imperial Japanese Army, and still houses military facilities and a large training area (the East Fuji Maneuver Area) for the modern Japanese Ground Self-Defense Force and the United States Marine Corps.

Gotemba was elevated to city status on February 11, 1955, through the merger of Gotemba Town with neighboring Fujioka Village, Harasato Village, Ino Village, and Tamaho Village. The city expanded through annexation of Takane Village on January 1, 1956 and the Furusawa District of Oyama Town on September 1, 1957. The Gotemba Interchange on the Tōmei Expressway was completed on May 25, 1969.

Government
Gotemba has a mayor-council form of government with a directly elected mayor and a unicameral city legislature of 21 members.

Economy
Gotemba has a mixed economy. Agriculture has traditionally been dominated by rice, irrigated by water from Mount Fuji, and has been supplemented by the growing of various green vegetables and the raising of pigs. Development of light industries, especially in food processing and electronics has profited through Gotemba's location on the Tōmei Expressway, and Gotemba is noted for a number of golf courses and a spacious outlet shopping center.

Retailing company Chelsea Japan rented former Gotemba Family Land Amusement Park, and officially opened in July 2000 as Gotemba Premium Outlets.

Education
Gotemba has ten public elementary schools and six public junior high schools operated by the city government, and two public high schools operated by the Shizuoka Prefectural Board of Education. The city also has one private high school, and the prefecture also operates one special education school for the disabled.

Transportation

Railway
 Central Japan Railway Company - Gotemba Line
 –  -

Highway
  Tōmei Expressway

Sister cities 
  – Chambersburg, Pennsylvania, United States (since August 22, 1960)
  – Beaverton, Oregon, United States (since October 22, 1987)

Military installations
JGSDF Camp Itazuma
JGSDF Camp Komakado
JGSDF Camp Takigahara
East Fuji Maneuver Area

Local attractions
The Peace Pagoda built in 1964 by Nipponzan-Myōhōji-Daisanga is a noted symbol of the city.

Notable people
Kenyu Horiuchi, voice actor
Nobuo Serizawa, professional golfer

References

External links 

Gotemba City official website
 Mount Fuji Gotemba Trail 

 
Cities in Shizuoka Prefecture